What a Woman Needs is the eleventh studio album by American singer Melba Moore. It was released by EMI America Records on October 12, 1981. Her debut project with the label, it reached number 46 US Top R&B/Hip-Hop Albums chart. Moore wrote six of the eight songs.

Track listing

Charts

References

1981 albums
Melba Moore albums
EMI America Records albums